Branched chain amino acid transaminase 1 is a protein that in humans is encoded by the BCAT1 gene. It is the first enzyme in the Branched-chain amino acid (BCAA) degradation pathway and facilitates the reversible transamination of BCAAs and glutamate. BCAT1 resides in the cytoplasm, while its isoform, BCAT2, is found in the mitochondria.

Function 

This gene encodes the cytosolic form of the enzyme branched-chain amino acid transaminase. This enzyme catalyzes the reversible transamination of branched-chain alpha-keto acids (BCKAs) to the branched-chain amino acids (BCAAs) Valine, Leucine and Isoleucine, which are essential for cell growth. In humans, its primary role is the deamination of BCAAs, as humans lack the enzymes for de novo synthesis of BCKAs. The respective cofactors are alpha-ketoglutarate and glutamate. The respective reactions are:

L-leucine + 2-oxoglutarate = 4-methyl-2-oxopentanoate + L-glutamate

L-isoleucine + 2-oxoglutarate = (S)-3-methyl-2-oxopentanoate + L-glutamate

L-valine + 2-oxoglutarate = 3-methyl-2-oxobutanoate + L-glutamate 

Cells can further degrade BCKAs by the Branched-chain keto acid dehydrogenase complex from which the carbon backbones of each BCAA may enter distinct degradation pathways.

The oncogenic transcription factor Myc is frequently reported to drive BCAT1 expression.

Clinical significance 

Two different clinical disorders have been attributed to a defect of branched-chain amino acid transamination: hypervalinemia and hyperleucine-isoleucinemia. As there is also a gene encoding a mitochondrial form of this enzyme (BCAT2), mutations in either gene may contribute to these disorders.

Overexpression of BCAT1 has been associated with a variety of cancers, among them glioblastoma, breast cancer, acute myeloid leukemia, gastric cancer and chronic myeloid leukemia.

References

Further reading 

 

Branched-chain amino acids